Monarch Park may refer to:

Monarch Park Stadium, multipurpose stadium in Toronto, Ontario
Monarch Park Collegiate, high school in Toronto, Ontario
Monarch Contemporary Art Center and Sculpture Park, Olympia, Washington